The geranium plume moth (Sphenarches anisodactylus) is a moth of the family Pterophoridae. It is found in western Africa, Madagascar, India, Sri Lanka, Thailand, Japan, the New Hebrides and Central and South America, as well as Australia, where it has been recorded from Cape York to central New South Wales. It is found in the United States, where it has been recorded from Florida, as well as Mississippi. It is also present in the Kermadec Islands of New Zealand.

The larvae feed on flower buds and flowers of Dolichos lablab, Lagenaria, Pelargonium and Fabaceae species. Other recorded food plants include Brillantaisia lamium, Caperonia castaneifolia, Phaseolus vulgaris, Hibiscus mutabilis, Thalia geniculata, Mimosa pudica, Orchidaceae, Averrhoa bilimbi, Passiflora foetida, Antirrhinum majus, Theobroma cacao and Lantana camara.

References

External links
Australian Faunal Directory
Moths of Australia
Australian Insects
Images

Moths described in 1864
Platyptiliini
Moths of Australia
Moths of Africa
Moths of Cape Verde
Moths of Asia
Moths of Japan
Moths of Madagascar
Moths of Réunion
Moths of Seychelles